Year 994 (CMXCIV) was a common year starting on Monday (link will display the full calendar) of the Julian calendar.

Events 
 By place 

 Byzantine Empire 
 September 15 – Battle of the Orontes: Fatimid forces, under Turkish general Manjutakin (also the governor of Damascus), besiege Apamea (modern Syria). Emperor Basil II sends a Byzantine expeditionary army, led by Dux Michael Bourtzes, to relieve the city in alliance with the Hamdanid Dynasty.  Manjutakin defeats the Hamdanids with his forces and attacks the Byzantine force in the rear. The Byzantine army panics and flees, losing some 5,000 men in the process.

 Europe 
 June 23 – Viking Age: Danish Viking raiders, (probably) under King Sweyn Forkbeard, plunder the city of Stade (Lower Saxony). Count Lothair Udo I is captured and killed, during the battle with the pirates.
 September – King Otto III, now 14 years old, receives the regalia to rule the Kingdom of Germany at an assembly of the Imperial Diet in Solingen. Otto appoints Heribert of Cologne as chancellor of Italy.

 England 
 A Danish Viking fleet, under Olaf Tryggvason, sails up the Thames Estuary, and besieges London. King Æthelred II (the Unready) pays Olaf 16,000 lbs of silver (Danegeld). 
 Olaf Tryggvason, already a baptised Christian, is confirmed as Christian in a ceremony at Andover. After receiving gifts from Æthelred II, Olaf leaves for Norway.

 By topic 

 Astronomy 
 An increase in carbon-14 concentration, recorded in tree rings, suggests that a strong solar storm may have hit the Earth in either 993 or 994.

Births 
 November 7 – Ibn Hazm, Andalusian historian and poet (d. 1064)
 Ahmad al-Bayhaqi, Persian Sunni hadith scholar (d. 1066)
 Alfonso V (the Noble), king of León (Spain) (d. 1028)
 Lothair Udo I, margrave of the Nordmark (d. 1057)
 Sancho III (the Great), king of Pamplona (approximate date)
 Simeon, Norman abbot of Ely Abbey (approximate date)
 Wallada bint al-Mustakfi, Andalusian female poet (d. 1091)

Deaths 
 February 3 – William IV, duke of Aquitaine (b. 937)
 April 4 – Egbert (the One-Eyed), German nobleman
 April 23 – Gerard of Toul, German priest and bishop
 May 11 – Majolus of Cluny, Frankish priest and abbot
 June 23 – Lothair Udo I, German nobleman (b. 950)
 June 24 – Abu Isa al-Warraq, Arab scholar (b. 889)
 July 8 – Richardis, margravine consort of Austria
 July 10 – Leopold I, margrave of Austria (b. 940)
 October 28 – Sigeric, archbishop of Canterbury 
 October 31 – Wolfgang, bishop of Regensburg
 Bagrat II, king of Iberia-Kartli (Georgia) (b. 937)
 Fujiwara no Takamitsu, Japanese waka poet
 Ibn Juljul, Andalusian physician (approximate date)
 Sancho Garcés II, king of Navarre (Spain)

References